The Arjan Garh Metro Station is located on the Yellow Line of the Delhi Metro. It is on the HUDA City Centre metro station route towards Gurgaon.

History

Station layout

Facilities
ATMs are available at Arjan Garh metro station.

Timing 
First & Last Metro = First towards Samaypur Badli :- 5:59:16
First towards Huda City Centre :- 5:59:16
Last towards Samayapur Badli :- 23:42:11
Last towards Huda City Centre :- 00:20:31

Entry/Exit

Connections

Bus
Delhi Transport Corporation bus routes number 517, Badarpur Border - Gurugram Bus Stand, Gurgaon Bus Stand - Badarpur Road, Malviya Nagar Metro - Sohna Road serves the station from outside metro station stop.

See also

Mehrauli
List of Delhi Metro stations
Transport in Delhi
Delhi Metro Rail Corporation
Delhi Suburban Railway
Delhi Monorail
Delhi Transport Corporation
South East Delhi
New Delhi
National Capital Region (India)
List of rapid transit systems
List of metro systems

References

External links

 Delhi Metro Rail Corporation Ltd. (Official site) 
 Delhi Metro Annual Reports
 
 UrbanRail.Net – Descriptions of all metro systems in the world, each with a schematic map showing all stations.

Delhi Metro stations
Railway stations opened in 2010
Railway stations in South Delhi district
2010 establishments in Delhi